This is a list of characters who appeared in the Scottish soap opera Take the High Road, broadcast from 1980 to 2003.

Series 1 (1980)
The first episode was broadcast by Scottish Television on 19 February 1980 and the series of 30 was broadcast two episodes per week till 28 May 1980.

First episode
In credits order:
 Elizabeth Cunningham (Edith MacArthur)
 Alan McIntyre (Martin Cochrane)
 Kay Grant (Vivien Heilbron)
 Max Langemann (Frederick Jaeger)
 Dougal Lachlan (Alec Monteath)
 Grace Lachlan (Marjorie Thomson)
 Amy Lachlan (Julie Ann Fullarton)
 Isabel Blair (Eileen McCallum)
 Jimmy Blair (Jimmy Chisholm)
 Ken Calder (Bill Henderson)
 Maggie Ferguson (Irene Sunters)
 Lorna Seton (Joan Alcorn)
 Fiona Cunningham (Caroline Ashley)

Other debut appearances in Series 1
 "Mrs Archie" (Anne Downie) – episode 9
 David Blair (Derek Anders) – episode 3
 George Carradine (Leon Sinden) – episode 22 only
 Rev. Gordon Cockburn (Roy Boutcher) – episode 4
 John Crawford (Andrew Downie) – episode 9
 Peter Cunningham (Donald Douglas) – episode 17
 Eric Duff (Hugh Evans) – episode 3; last seen in episode 7
 Ian Duff (Gregor Fisher) – episode 3; last seen in episode 7
 Willi von Haupt (Ian Patrick) – episode 8 only	
 Donald Lachlan (Master Alan Dunbar) – episode 3
 Alice McEwan (Muriel Romanes) – episode 8
 Leslie Maxwell (Andrew Robertson) – episode 6
 Archie Menzies (Paul Kermack) – episode 9
 Andy Semple (Alexander Morton) – episode 13; absconds in episode 14
 Jane Steedman (Ingrid Hafner) – episode 14
 Bob Taylor (Iain Agnew) – episode 5
 'Sorry' Watson (Ron Paterson) – episode 25
 Mr Wedderburn (Willie Joss) – episode 13 only
 sheep rustlers (Ricky Don and Bill MacFarlane) – episodes 16 & 18 only

Departing characters who make return appearances
 Andy Semple

Final appearances
 John Crawford
 Eric Duff
 Ian Duff
 Amy Lachlan (died in episode 2)
 Max Langemann
 Leslie Maxwell

Series 2 (1980)
The second series had 26 episodes (nos. 31–56) broadcast from 14 October 1980 to 7 January 1981.

Debut appearances in Series 2
 Brian Blair (Kenneth Watson)
 Dr Wallace (Michael Elder)

Final appearances
 "Mrs Archie"
 Kay Grant
 Alan McIntyre

Series 3 (1981)
The third series had 26 episodes (nos. 57–82) broadcast from 7 April 1981 to 2 July 1981.

Debut appearances in Series 3
 Lucy Armstrong (Marjorie Dalziel)
 Helen Blair (Bridget Biagi)
 Douglas Dunbar (Clive Graham)
 Kirsty Forsyth (Anna Davidson)
 Alison Lambert (Carol Ann Crawford)
 Hamish McNeil (William Armour)
 Morag Stewart (Jeannie Fisher)
 Lady Strathmorris (Ellen McIntosh)
 Lord Andrew Strathmorris (Bernard Gallagher)
 Malky Wilson (Freddie Boardley)

Final appearances
 Jane Steedman
 Malky Wilson

Series 4 (1981–1982)
The fourth series had 44 episodes (nos. 83–126) broadcast from 6 October 1981 to 18 March 1982.

Debut appearances in Series 4
 Tom Clifton (Jonathan Battersby)
 Peter Craig (Jay Smith)
 Robert Forsyth (Ian Wallace)
 Sojer Johnny (Chic Murray)

Departing characters

Series 5 (1982)
The fifth series had 36 episodes (nos. 127–162) broadcast from 24 August 1982 to 23 December 1982.

Debut appearances in Series 5
 Kate Blair (Lucy Durham-Matthews)
 Sarah Cunningham (Claire Nielson)
 Bruno Rheinhardt (Tony Caunter)
 Alec Geddes (James Cosmo)
 Graeme B. Hogg (Jim Byars)
 Tom Kerr aka "Inverdarroch" (John Stahl)
 Mrs Mary Mack (Gwyneth Guthrie)
 Rev Iain McPherson (John Young)
 Mr Obidiah Arthur Murdoch (Robert Trotter)
 Sergeant Murray (James McDonald)
 Jackie Ogilvie (Hazel McBride)
 Eddie Ramsay (Robin Cameron)
 Jean Semple (Jeni Giffen)
 Jamie Stewart (James Copeland)

Departing characters who make return appearances
 Maggie Ferguson – as Maggie Watson

Departing characters

Series 6 (1983–1984)
The sixth series had 88 episodes (nos. 163–250) broadcast from 7 August 1983 to 20 March 1984.

Debut appearances in Series 6
 Jock Campbell (Iain Stewart)
 Marion Cochrane (Lizzie Radford)
 Dan Lamont (Ray Jeffries)
 Irene Lamont (Trudy Bryce)
 Sheila Lamont (Lesley Fitz-Simons)
 Effie MacInnes (Mary Riggans)
 Carol McKay (Terri Lally)
 John Morrison (Adrian Reynolds)
 Mr Thomson (John Shedden)
 Miss Richardson (Sheila Grier)

Characters making return appearances
 Maggie Watson

Final appearances
 Douglas Dunbar
 John Morrison
 Jackie Ogilvie
 Miss Richardson
 Mr Thomson

Series 7 (1984–1985)
The seventh series had 44 episodes (nos. 251–294) broadcast from 4 September 1984 to 7 February 1985.

Debut appearances in Series 7
 Sally Shaw (Judith Sweeney)
 Davie Sneddon (Derek Lord) Episode 237
 Willie Stewart (Walter Carr)
 Lily Taylor (Thelma Rogers)

Return guest appearances
 Maggie Watson

Departing characters who make return appearances
 Jimmy Blair
 Sally Shaw

Series 8 (1985)
The eighth series had 44 episodes (nos. 295–338) broadcast from 14 May 1985 to 3 October 1985.

Debut appearances in Series 8
 Sandra Blair (Johanna Hargreaves)
 Florence Crossan (Gwyneth Guthrie)
 Ruari Galbraith (Charles Jamieson)
 Rev Parker (Paul Young)

Return appearances 
 Lily Taylor

Departing characters who make return appearances in later years
 Sandra Blair
 Florence Crossan
 Lily Taylor

Final appearances 
 Ken Calder

1986
Starting on 18 March 1986, the ninth (episodes 339–415)

Debut appearances
 Joyce Cameron (Georgine Anderson)
 Willie Gillespie (Joe Mullaney)
 Mr Hendry (Gerry Slevin)
 Jim Hunter (Alan Cumming)
 Fergus Jamieson (Frank Wylie)
 Jockie McDonald (Jackie Farrell)
 Heather McNeil (Bridget McCann)
 Constable Graham McPhee (Stuart Bishop)
 Mrs Jean McTaggart (Jean Faulds)
 Harry Shaw (Lawrie McNicol)
 Oggie Wilson (Sean Scanlon)

Characters making return appearances
 Jimmy Blair
 Sally Shaw

Departing characters who will make return appearances
 Jim Hunter
 Eddie Ramsay
 Harry Shaw
 Sally Shaw

Final appearances
 Jimmy Blair
 Joyce Cameron
 Elizabeth Cunningham
 Mr Hendry

1987 
Starting on 2 February 1987  (episodes 416–1517)  was a continuous run till the last episode on 27 April 2003. There were some gaps in regular transmission, though storylines continued uninterrupted on each resumption. However there was  4 month Story gap between Episode 728 - 729, but there was no gap in transmission.

Debut appearances 
 Susan Duncan (Jacqueline Gilbride)
 Lynne McNeil (Gillian McNeil)
 Mairi McNeil (Anne Myatt)
 Mark Ritchie (Peter Raffan)
 Eric Ross-Gifford (Richard Greenwood)
 Joanna Ross-Gifford (Tamara Kennedy)
 Sir John Ross-Gifford (Michael Browning)
 Lady Margaret Ross-Gifford (Jan Waters)

Return appearances 
 Harry Shaw
 Sally Shaw

Character re-casting 
 Willie Gillespie (Ewen Emery replaces Joe Mullaney)
 Donald Lachlan (Steven Brown takes over the role.)

Final appearances 
 Jamie Stewart (James Copeland)
 Mrs Mctavish
 Sorry Watson (Ron Paterson)

1988

Debut appearances 
 Gladys Aitken (Ginni Barlow)
 Mrs Galbraith (Diana Ollson)
 Claire Kerr (Julie Miller)
 Scott Logan (Micky MacPherson)
 Tam Logan (John Murtagh)
 Joe Reilly (Ian Bleasdale)
 Moira Reilly (Anne Kidd)
 Lady William (Madeline Christie)
 Michael Ross (Gordon MacArthur)

Returning characters 
 Jim Hunter

Final appearances 
 Jim Hunter
 Tam Logan
 Lady Margaret Ross Gifford

1989

Debut appearances 
 Emma Aitken (Amanda Whitehead)
 Colin Begg (Kern Falconer)

Character re-casting 
 Alice Taylor (Barbara Rafferty replaces Muriel Romanes)

Return appearances 
 Susan Duncan
 David Blair
 Harry Shaw
 Eddie Ramsay
 Jock Campbell

Final appearances 
 Calsang
 Scott Logan
 Harry Shaw
 Lord Strathmorris
 Jock Campbell

1990 
In March 1990, a major production change took place which resulted in a number of longer term cast members being replaced.

Debut appearances 
 Sam Hagen (Briony McRoberts)
 Paul Martin (Peter Bruce)
 Gary McDonald (Joseph McFadden)
 Sadie McDonald (Doreen Cameron)
 Trish McDonald (Natalie J. Robb)
 Jessie McKay (Wilma Duncan)
 Alun Morgan (Mike Hayward)
 Greg Ryder (Alan Hunter)
 Kenny Tosh (Alistair Galbraith)
 Tee Jay Wilson (Andrew Gillan)
 Shona (Eilidh Fraser/Alicia Devine)

Departing characters who will return later 
 Claire Kerr
 Tom Kerr aka "Inverdarroch"
 Eddie Ramsay
 Mr Murdoch
 Davie Sneddon

Characters making return guest appearances 
 Sandra Blair
 Andy Semple
 Maggie Watson
 Lily Wentworth

Final appearances 
 Mrs Anderson
 Sandra Blair
 Brian Blair
 Archie Menzies
 Hamish McNeil
 Rev Parker
 Mark Ritchie
 Sir John Ross Gifford
 Lorna Seton
 Alice Taylor
 Bob Taylor
 Maggie Watson
 Lily Wentworth
 Lady William

1991

Debut appearances 
 Mr Crawford (James Bryce)
 PC Douglas Kirk (Graeme Robertson)
 Margo McGeogh (Mandy Matthews)
 Gordon Sinclair (Paul Hickey)
 Matt Sinclair (Jake D'Arcy)
 Peggy Sinclair (Donalda Samuel)
 Andrew Wilson (Bill Murdoch)
 Cathy Wilson (Jo Cameron Brown)

Characters making return guest appearances 
 Florence Crossan (Gwyneth Guthrie)
 Andy Semple

Final appearances 
 Florence Crossan
 Paul Martin
 Mr McPherson
 Kenny Tosh

1992

Debut appearances 
 Joe Breslin (Kenneth Glenaan)
 DI Busby (Laurie Ventry)
 Leonard Carter (Robert Robertson)
 John Clark (Alan McHugh)
 Jennifer Goudie (Victoria Burton)
 Cecelia Hunter (Eiledh Fraser)
 Celia Maxwell (Annette Staines)
 Catriona McNeil (Lynsey Jane Thompson)
 Sandy McNeil (Rainer Ross)
 Menna Morgan (Manon Jones)
 Nick Stapleton (Stephen Hogan)
 Duncan Strachan (Ron Donachie)
 Mark Torrance (Gary Bakewell)

Characters making return appearances 
 Tom Kerr

Departing characters who will make return appearances 
 DI Busby
 Jennifer Goudie
 Mr Murdoch

Final appearances 
 John Clark
 Donald Lachlan
 Dougal Lachlan
 Gladys Lachlan
 Jessie McKay
 Gordon Sinclair
 Mark Torrance

1993

Debut appearances 
 Judith Crombie (Anne Marie Timoney)
 Iain Strathmorris (James Coombes)

Characters making return appearances 
 DI Busby
 Jennifer Goudie

Departing characters who will make return appearances 
 Sam Hagen
 Tom Kerr

Characters making their last regular appearances 
 Grace Lachlan
 Jean McTaggart

Final appearances 
 Emma Aitken
 DI Busby
 Leonard Carter
 Jennifer Goudie
 Fergus Jamieson
 Sadie McDonald
 Lynne McNeil
 Fiona Ryder
 Greg Ryder
 Nick Stapleton
 Duncan Strachan

1994

Debut appearances 
 Tiffany Bowles (Rachel Ogilvy)
 Callum Gilchrist (Jim Webster)
 Sarah Gilchrist (Shonagh Price)
 Phineas North (William Tapley)

Returning characters 
 Sam Hagen
 Mr Murdoch

Departing characters who will return 
 Tee Jay Wilson

1995

Debut appearances 
 Chic Cherry (Andy Cameron)
 Jaffa Cherry (Rab Christie)
 Dominic Dunbar (Gary Hollywood)
 Peter Odell (Ross Davidson)
 Ewan Patterson (David McGowan)
 Cheryl Thom (Kerry Lyn Hamilton)

Return guest appearances 
 Mr Murdoch
 Grace Lachlan
 Jean McTaggart

Final appearances 
 Judith Crombie
 Grace Lachlan
 Jean McTaggart
 Tee Jay Wilson

1996

Debut appearances 
 Kelly Marie Cherry (Catherine Keating)
 Senga Cherry (Libby McArthur)
 Stella Greg (Anne Downie)
 Victor Kemp (Iain Andrew)
 Sally McGann (Catriona Evans)
 Paul Lafferty (Simon Weir)

Returning characters 
 Alun Morgan
 Menna Morgan
 Tom Kerr
 Phineas North

Final appearances 
 Alun Morgan
 Michael Ross
 Susan Ross

1997

Debut appearances 
 Dylan Geddes (Stephen Callaghan)
 Martin Geddes (Alex Harvey)
 Kitty McIvor (Sarah Gudgeon)
 Lachie McIvor (Alec Heggie)
 PC Tony Piacentini (Alan McHugh)
 Dr Andy Sharp (Richard Conlon)

Return guest appearances 
 Menna Morgan

Final appearances 
 Tiffany Bowles
 Dylan Geddes
 Martin Geddes
 Gary McDonald
 Menna Morgan
 Peter O'Dell
 Carol Wilson

1998

Debut appearances 
 Jude Burnett (Deborah McCallum)
 Maureen Gilchrist (Lesley Mackie)
 Tina Harrigan (Amanda Beveridge)

Character re-casting 
 Sandy McNeil (Joel Strachan replaces Rainer Ross)

Returning characters 
 Sandy McNeil

Final appearances

1999

Debut appearances 
 Ewan Logan (Gordon Brown)
 Dan Sutherland (John Havlin)

Returning characters 
 Tina Harrigan

Final appearances 
 Jude Burnett
 Tina Harrigan
 Trish McDonald
 Sandy McNeil

2000

Debut appearances 
 Siobhan Devlin (Chrissi Jo Hyde)
 Nigel Jenkins (Keith Warwick)
 Liam Peters (Garry Sweeney)

Departing characters who will return 
Joanna Ross-Gifford
Kitty McIvor

Final appearances 
 Sam Hagen
 Dr Andy Sharp

2001 

Debut appearances

George McCracken (Malcolm Hemmings)

Departing characters 
Eric Ross-Gifford

Return guest appearances 
Claire Kerr
George Carradine (Leon Sinden)

2002

Debut appearances 
Dr Douglas Clark (John Kazek)
Mr Spinetti (Terry Wale)

Departing characters 
Eddie Ramsay

Characters who depart until final episode 

Isabel Blair

2003

Returning characters 
Joanna Ross-Gifford

Characters who return for the final episode 
 Isabel Blair
 Kitty McIvor
 Lynne McNeil

Cast list from the final episode
 Isabel Blair (Eileen McCallum)
 Sheila Ramsay (Lesley Fitz-Simons)
 Effie McDonald (Mary Riggans)
 Jockie McDonald (Jackie Farrell)
 Mairi McIvor (Anne Myatt)
 Lachie MacIvor (Alec Heggie)
 Morag Kerr (Jeannie Fisher)
 Tom Kerr (John Stahl)
 Mrs Mack (Gwyneth Guthrie)
 Victor Kemp (Iain Andrew)
 Nigel Jenkins (Keith Warwick)
 Davie Sneddon (Derek Lord)
 Niall Cassidy (Barry Lord)
 Alec MacGlashan (Stewart McMinn)
 Sally McGann (Catriona Evans)
 Sarah McDonald (Shonagh Price)
 Baby Sadie McDonald (Courtney Jane McWatt)
 PC Tony Piacentini (Alan McHugh)
 Chic Cherry (Andy Cameron)
 Paul Lafferty (Simon Weir)
 Ewan Logan (Gordon Brown)
 Mr Spinetti (Terry Wale)
 Kitty McIvor (Sarah Gudgeon)
 Lynne McNeil (Gillian McNeil)
 Surveyor (Ronnie Simon)
 Dr Douglas Clark (John Kazek)

References

Bibliography
 
 

Take the High Road
Take the High Road